Circe is a 2018 novel by American writer Madeline Miller. Set during the Greek Heroic Age, it is an adaptation of various Greek myths, most notably the Odyssey, as told from the perspective of the witch Circe. The novel explores Circe's origin story and narrates Circe's encounters with mythological figures such as Hermes, the Minotaur, Jason, and Medea, and ultimately her romance with Odysseus and his son, Telemachus.

Plot
Circe is the divine daughter of the titan Helios and naiad Perse. Deemed unattractive and powerless from birth, Circe's early life is lonely until she falls in love with the mortal fisherman Glaucos. Devastated by his mortality, Circe discovers a way to make him a god: she transforms him into his 'true form' using the sap of magical flowers, grown in soil that was once soaked with the blood of the titan Kronos. Arrogant in his divinity, however, Glaucos rejects Circe in favor of the nymph Scylla. Circe's jealousy causes her to use the flowers' magic again, accidentally transforming Scylla into a bloodthirsty six-headed monster. Remorseful, Circe confesses her deeds to Helios, who realizes all of his children with Perse are witches capable of extracting power from herbs and draughts. 

As punishment for admitting her witchcraft, Circe is banished by Zeus to eternal exile on the island of Aiaia. She uses the beginning of her exile to study and hone her witchcraft, tending gardens and experimenting with draughts. Over the centuries she spends on Aiaia, Circe interacts with many mythic figures. She receives visits from the Olympian god Hermes, whom she takes as a lover. She is once escorted off the island by the mortal Daedalus, at the request of Circe's sister and the Queen of Crete, Pasiphaë. During the brief visit to Crete, Circe helps her sister birth the Minotaur and uses her witchcraft to help tame the monster. Many years later, the hero Jason and his wife the witch Medea (Circe's niece) arrive on Aiaia after having stolen the Golden Fleece from Circe's brother Aeëtes, murdering Medea's brother Absyrtus in the process. Circe cleanses them of the crime and warns Medea of Jason's waning interest, but is rebuffed.

Circe enters a period of loneliness after her confrontation with Medea, and is excited to host a group of forlorn sailors who arrive one night on Aiaia in search of food and rest. However, once the sailors realize that Circe lives alone on the island with no men to protect her, the ship captain rapes her. Circe then uses her witchcraft to kill all of the men. Remorseful about having killed so many men, and now weary of visitors, when the next ship comes  to her island she uses her witchcraft to transform the men into pigs.

Circe bestows the same fate upon hundreds more sailors who come to her island over the coming years. One particular ship arrives led by the hero Odysseus, who charms Circe into sparing his crew and hosting them on her island over the winter. Odysseus and his crew ultimately stay on Aiaia for one year, during which a romance grows between Circe and Odysseus. After Odysseus leaves to continue his journey back to Ithaca, Circe gives birth to a son, Telegonus.

Raising the infant Telegonus, Circe quickly realizes that something is amiss and learns that the goddess Athena threatens her son. Circe casts a spell to protect the island while Telegonus grows. When the teenage Telegonus begs to leave the island to meet his father, Circe acquires the tail of the stingray god Trygon and begrudgingly sends her son off, armed with the tail atop a spear. When Telegonus meets his father, however, Odysseus attacks him and is accidentally killed by the poisoned spear. Guilty, Telegonus returns home with Odysseus' wife Penelope and son Telemachus.

Having lost her hero Odysseus, Athena visits Aiaia to offer her patronage to Telemachus, who refuses her. Telegonus accepts in his stead, and embarks on his own heroic journey. Forlorn by the loss of her son, Circe negotiates with Helios to end her exile. With Telemachus' help, Circe uses the poison spear to turn Scylla to stone and collects more of the flowers she once used on Glaucos. Finding love with Telemachus, Circe uses the flowers' magic on herself with the intention of becoming mortal and living out her days traveling with Telemachus.

Critical reception
In a review for the New York Times, Claire Messud describes Miller's Circe as "pleasurable," approving of its feminist themes and its "highly psychologized, redemptive and ultimately exculpatory account" of Circe's familiar tale. A Washington Post review by Ron Charles contextualizes Miller's novel within the Me Too movement and praises her reimagining of Circe's story as "harrowing and unexpected", casting a "feminist light" on timeless tales that "illuminates details we hadn’t noticed before." The Guardians Aida Edemariam also praises Miller for finding novelty and "narrative propulsion" by anchoring her retelling around the "emotional life of a woman."

In 2018, Circe was named the Best Fantasy novel in the Goodreads Choice Awards, received the Red Tentacle Kitschie Award for best novel, and was an Athenaeum Literary Award winner. In 2019, the novel was shortlisted for the Women's Prize for Fiction and the Mythopoeic Fantasy Award.

Adaptations
In 2019, HBO Max announced an upcoming 8-part miniseries dramatic adaptation of the novel, to be written and produced by Rick Jaffa and Amanda Silver.

See also
 Circe
 Circe in popular culture
 The Song of Achilles

References

2018 American novels
Novels set in ancient Greece
Novels based on the Iliad
Novels based on the Odyssey
American romance novels
American fantasy novels
Romantic fantasy novels
Greek and Roman deities in fiction
Little, Brown and Company books
Feminist novels
Circe